Panciu is a town in Vrancea County, Romania. It has a population of approximately 7,600. It administers five villages: Crucea de Jos, Crucea de Sus, Dumbrava, Neicu and Satu Nou.

The town is located in the east-central part of the county, on the banks of the Șușița River. The region is famous for its white wines but also for its sparkling wines (white, red and rosé).

Writer Ioan Slavici died in Panciu in 1926, and was buried at the hermitage within .

Natives
 Stelian Isac
 Dan Nica

References

External links

 Panciu Town Hall

Towns in Romania
Populated places in Vrancea County
Localities in Western Moldavia